João Pedro Ferreira Silva (born 1 August 1999), known as Jota, is a Portuguese professional footballer who plays for Vitória S.C. as a winger.

Club career
Jota was born in Melres, Gondomar, Porto District. He started his senior career in the third division, with UD Sousense and S.C. Espinho.

On 7 July 2020, Jota signed a three-year contract with LigaPro club Leixões SC. He made his professional debut on 13 September, starting in a 2–2 home draw against Casa Pia AC. His first goals came on 16 October, a brace in the 3–1 win over Varzim S.C. also at the Estádio do Mar.

Late in the 2021 January transfer window, Jota joined Casa Pia of the same league until June 2023 after severing his ties to Leixões. In the 2021–22 season, he scored 11 times to help his team return to the Primeira Liga after 83 years. 

Jota agreed to a three-year deal with Vitória de Guimarães on 1 June 2022. He made his top-flight debut on 7 August, in a 1–0 away defeat of G.D. Chaves.

References

External links

1999 births
Living people
People from Gondomar, Portugal
Sportspeople from Porto District
Portuguese footballers
Association football wingers
Primeira Liga players
Liga Portugal 2 players
Campeonato de Portugal (league) players
S.C. Espinho players
Leixões S.C. players
Casa Pia A.C. players
Vitória S.C. players